Ivan Dodig and Édouard Roger-Vasselin were the defending champions,  but Dodig chose not to participate this year. Roger-Vasselin played alongside Jürgen Melzer but lost in the quarterfinals to Tomislav Brkić and Ante Pavić.

Nikola Ćaćić and Mate Pavić won the title, defeating Dominic Inglot and Aisam-ul-Haq Qureshi in the final, 6–4, 6–7(4–7), [10–4].

Seeds

Draw

Draw

References

External links
 Main Draw

Open Sud de France
Doubles